The desert hedgehog (Paraechinus aethiopicus)  is a species of mammal in the family Erinaceidae.

Basic facts
The desert hedgehog is one of the smallest of hedgehogs. The quills (or spines to give their correct name) on its back can be banded with coloring similar to the four-toed hedgehog. It is usually identified by its dark muzzle. If desert hedgehogs are threatened, their muscles go tight and pull the outer layer of skin around the body, making their quills stick out in all directions. The quills tend to be longer than other hedgehogs for better protection against predation. As such it is extremely difficult to catch one.

Distribution
It is found in Bahrain, Algeria, Chad, Djibouti, Egypt, Eritrea, Iran, Iraq, Israel, Jordan, Kuwait, Libya, Mali, Mauritania, Morocco, Niger, Oman, Saudi Arabia, Somalia, Sudan, Syria, Tunisia, United Arab Emirates, Yemen, and possibly Ethiopia.

Breeding
Breeding begins in March, after hibernation has ended. The female desert hedgehog gives birth to up to six young, in a burrow or concealed nest, after a gestation period of around 30 to 40 days. The young are born deaf and blind, and with the quills located just under the skin, to prevent damage to the female during birth. The quills emerge within a few hours, and the eyes open after around 21 days. The young desert hedgehogs are weaned after about 40 days. There is thought to be single litter each year.

Threats
The desert hedgehog is reported to be a common species with a wide distribution and a large population. It is believed to be reasonably tolerant of habitat modification, and is not considered globally threatened. No major threats are reported for the species, although some note that increasing desertification within its range may be leading to the fragmentation of its populations, and in some areas it may suffer increased mortality due to road traffic. The Desert hedgehog is a host of the Acanthocephalan intestinal parasite Moniliformis saudi.

References

External links

desert hedgehog
Fauna of Iran
Mammals of the Middle East
Mammals of North Africa
Mammals of the Arabian Peninsula
desert hedgehog
Taxonomy articles created by Polbot
Taxa named by Christian Gottfried Ehrenberg